Earnshaw (also Lewistown) is an unincorporated community in Wetzel County, West Virginia, United States. It lies at an elevation of 1,070 feet (326 m).

References

Unincorporated communities in Wetzel County, West Virginia
Unincorporated communities in West Virginia